Melanodexia californica is a species of cluster fly in the family Polleniidae.

Distribution
United States.

References

Polleniidae
Insects described in 1948
Diptera of North America